The Cyprus Swimming Federation founded in 1972, is the aquatics national federation for Cyprus. It oversees competition in 4 Olympic aquatic sports (water polo, swimming, diving and open water swimming).

It is affiliated to:

FINA, the International Swimming Federation
LEN, the European Swimming League
COC, the Cyprus Olympic Committee.

See also
List of Cypriot records in swimming

References

External links
Official website

Cyprus
Swimming in Cyprus
Aquatics
Cyprus
1972 establishments in Cyprus